Borgulya István, (born 5 February 1971) is a retired Hungarian footballer who played as a forward.
He spent most of his career in Budapest Honvéd.

References

External links
Nemzeti Sport (Istvan Borgulya)
Eurosport Profile

1971 births
Living people
Footballers from Budapest
Hungarian footballers
Association football forwards
Budapest Honvéd FC players
Budapesti VSC footballers
Vasas SC players
Vác FC players
Stadler FC footballers
Nemzeti Bajnokság I players